Final Embrace is a photograph showing two victims in the rubble of the April 2013 collapse of the eight storey Rana Plaza building in Savar Upazila, Bangladesh. The photograph, taken by freelance photographer Taslima Akhter, was awarded third prize in the World Press Photo (single) in the "spot news category". It was also selected among Time magazine's "Top 10 Photos of 2013".

Akhter is a member of Nari Sanghati (a women's welfare organization), and a member of leftist political group Gana Sanghati Andolon. She works as a teacher at Pathshala, a school of photography in Dhaka.

References

Color photographs
Photography in Bangladesh
2013 in Bangladesh
2013 works
2013 in art
21st century in photography
2010s photographs